Sucharitra is a rāgam in Carnatic music (musical scale of South Indian classical music). It is the 67th melakarta rāgam (parent scale) in the 72 melakarta rāgam system of Carnatic music. It is considered an unattractive raga and is rarely performed. It is called Santāna manjari in the Muthuswami Dikshitar school of Carnatic music.

Structure and Lakshana

It is the 1st rāgam in the 12th chakra Aditya. The mnemonic name is Aditya-Pa. The mnemonic phrase is sa ru gu mi pa dha na. Its  structure (ascending and descending scale) is as follows (see swaras in Carnatic music for details on below notation and terms):
 : 
 : 

The swaras used in this scale are shatsruthi rishabham, antara gandharam, prati madhyamam, shuddha dhaivatham and shuddha nishadham. Sucharitra, being a melakarta rāgam, by definition is a sampoorna rāgam (has all seven notes in ascending and descending scale). It is the prati madhyamam equivalent of Yagapriya, which is the 31st melakarta scale.

Janya rāgams
Sucharitra currently has no janya rāgam (derived scale) associated with it. See List of janya rāgams for those janyas associated with other melakarta rāgams.

CompositionsSucharitra scale has been used for the following compositions:Harinamada araaginiyu by Purandara Dasa
 Chintayami santatam by Dr. M. Balamuralikrishna
 Velu mayil by Koteeswara Iyer
 Santana manjari by Muthuswami Dikshitar

Related rāgams
This section covers the theoretical and scientific aspect of this rāgam.Sucharitra's notes when shifted using Graha bhedam, does not yield any other melakarta rāgam. Graha bhedam is the step taken in keeping the relative note frequencies same, while shifting the shadjam'' to the next note in the rāgam.

Notes

References

Melakarta ragas